Bang! is a mostly live EP released only in Japan by the Goo Goo Dolls in 1997 for Warner Bros. Records.

Track listing

Sources
MusicBrainz page for Bang!
Amazon.com page

1995 EPs
Goo Goo Dolls live albums
1995 live albums
Live EPs
Warner Records live albums
Warner Records EPs